The Kevichüsa family is a Naga family prominent in the fields of politics, entertainment, fashion design and business.

Background 
Kevichüsa Angami was born on 15 April 1903. He was the son of Nisier Meru, the first christian convert of Khonoma. Kevichüsa married Mannie Germanthangi in 1931. Together the couple had ten children: six daughters and four sons. The descendants of Kevichüsa later adopted his name as their last names.

People 
 Kevichüsa Angami (1903–1990), Politician
 Andrea Kevichüsa (born 2001), Model and Actress
 Angelina Kevichüsa, Miss India Runner up (1975)
 Bambi Kevichüsa, Fashion Designer
 Chalie Kevichüsa (1943–1992), Journalist
 Kethoser Aniu Kevichüsa, Author and Speaker
 Razhukhrielie Kevichüsa (1941–2022), Bureaucrat and Musician
 Tubu Kevichüsa (1948–1996), Nationalist Leader

References

 
Naga families